The New Zealand women's national cricket team toured Australia in January and February 1979. They played against Australia in three Test matches, with Australia winning the series 1–0.

Squads

Tour Matches

40-over match: New South Wales Junior v New Zealand

2-day match: Western Australia v New Zealand

40-over match: South Australia v New Zealand

45-over match: Victoria Women's Cricket Association President's XI v New Zealand

2-day match: Victoria v New Zealand

WTest Series

1st Test

2nd Test

3rd Test

References

External links
New Zealand Women tour of Australia 1978/79 from Cricinfo

Women's international cricket tours of Australia
1979 in Australian cricket
New Zealand women's national cricket team tours